Architectonica maxima, common name giant sundial, is a species of sea snail, a marine gastropod mollusk in the family Architectonicidae, which are known as the staircase shells or sundials.

Description
Architectonica maxima has a shell that reaches 19 – 82 mm and it is the largest member of the sundial family. This shell is low-spired and quite flattened, with a beaded surface. The shoulder slope is divided into two ribs by a spiral groove. The basic color is cream, with brown spots.

Distribution
This species can be found in the Indo-Pacific, from East Africa and the Persian Gulf to western Pacific, Japan, eastern Australia, New Zealand, New Caledonia and Hawaii.

Habitat
Giant sundial is a carnivore deeper water sea snail living on sandy patches and muddy sublittoral bottoms, close to soft corals, at a depth of 10 – 280 m.

References

Architectonicidae
Gastropods described in 1849